Gooding is the county seat and largest city of Gooding County, Idaho, United States.  The population was 3,567 at the 2010 census.

The city is named for Frank R. Gooding, a local sheep rancher who became a prominent political figure in Idaho in the early 20th century, serving as both Governor of Idaho and a United States Senator. The original name of Gooding was Toponis.

Gooding is home to the Idaho School for the Deaf and the Blind.

The world's largest factory for barrel cheese, the raw product for processed cheese, is located in Gooding. It has a capacity of 120,000 metric tons per year of barrel cheese and belongs to the Glanbia group. Gooding is also home to Gooding High School and Gooding Middle School.

Demographics

2010 census
As of the census of 2010, there were 3,567 people, 1,395 households, and 864 families residing in the city. The racial makeup of the city was 84.6% White, 0.4% African American, 0.9% Native American, 0.6% Asian, 11.2% from other races, and 2.2% from two or more races. Hispanic or Latino of any race were 22.9% of the population.

There were 1,395 households, of which 35.8% had children under the age of 18 living with them, 44.3% were married couples living together, 12.2% had a female householder with no husband present, 5.4% had a male householder with no wife present, and 38.1% were non-families. 33.0% of all households were made up of individuals, and 19% had someone living alone who was 65 years of age or older. The average household size was 2.53 and the average family size was 3.26.

The median age in the city was 33.5 years. 29.7% of residents were under the age of 18; 9.2% were between the ages of 18 and 24; 24.5% were from 25 to 44; 19% were from 45 to 64; and 17.7% were 65 years of age or older. The gender makeup of the city was 50.0% male and 50.0% female.

2000 census
As of the census of 2000, there were 3,384 people, 1,304 households, and 842 families residing in the city. The racial makeup of the city was 89.51% White, 0.15% African American, 1.60% Native American, 0.21% Asian, 5.97% from other races, and 2.57% from two or more races. Hispanic or Latino of any race were 14.80% of the population.

There were 1,304 households, out of which 31.3% had children under the age of 18 living with them, 50.5% were married couples living together, 9.7% had a female householder with no husband present, and 35.4% were non-families. 31.5% of all households were made up of individuals, and 18.7% had someone living alone who was 65 years of age or older.  The average household size was 2.47 and the average family size was 3.11.

In the city, the population was spread out, with 27.7% under the age of 18, 8.3% from 18 to 24, 24.0% from 25 to 44, 18.8% from 45 to 64, and 21.1% who were 65 years of age or older.  The median age was 37 years. For every 100 females, there were 98.8 males.  For every 100 females age 18 and over, there were 90.4 males.

The median income for a household in the city was $29,316, and the median income for a family was $33,309. Males had a median income of $24,688 versus $16,926 for females. The per capita income for the city was $13,752.  About 12.4% of families and 17.3% of the population were below the poverty line, including 28.8% of those under age 18 and 15.1% of those age 65 or over.

Geography
Gooding is located at  (42.937097, -114.713480), near the confluence of the Big Wood River and Little Wood River, which merge to form the Malad River.

Climate
According to the Köppen climate classification, Gooding has a cold semi arid climate (BSk).

Schools
There are six schools based in Gooding; four in the Gooding Joint School District, the North Valley Academy charter school, and the Idaho School for the Deaf and the Blind. Another school, Gooding College, closed in 1938.

Gooding Joint School District
The Gooding Joint School District operates three schools: Gooding Elementary School, Gooding Middle School, and Gooding High School.

There are approximately 1200 students in the district.  It ranks 43rd in size amongst the 114 school districts in Idaho.

The Gooding Joint School District was ranked in fourth place (in the small district category) on the Digital School Districts Survey, for its "use of technology to govern the district [and to] communicate with students, parents and the community."

Gooding School District was the first district in the nation to win the HealthierUS Challenge "Gold Award of Distinction."

North Valley Academy

The North Valley Academy charter school was approved December 20, 2007.  Kindergarten through eighth grade started in the 2008–2009 school year, grades 9-12 began in the 2009–2010 school year.

Idaho School for the Deaf and the Blind
The Idaho School for the Deaf and the Blind (ISDB) was first established in 1906 in Boise and operated there until it burned down on December 8, 1908.  The Idaho Legislature passed an act on March 16, 1909 establishing a permanent state school.  Governor Frank Gooding donated land for the ISDB so it was moved to Gooding and started accepting students in September 1910.

The school covers a  area and provides dormitories for many of its students and has other facilities, such as a gymnasium and park.

Gooding College
The school's largest enrollment was 209 students, in 1928. Buildings of the college were added to the National Register of Historic Places in 1983, listed as "Gooding College Campus". The surviving building of the campus, which dates to 1920, became a tuberculosis hospital in 1946, and was later converted into an inn.

Sanitation

The city of Gooding has their own trucks and containers for garbage collection. Residents are billed for this service via a monthly utility bill that also includes billing for water and sewerage services.  Each occupied residence is furnished with one 90 gallon disposal container. Residential containers are emptied once weekly.   In 2010, sanitation became a widely debated issue in the lead up to municipal post elections, although there have since been no change to their arrangements.

See also
 Gooding Milner canal

References

External links

 
 Gooding Joint School District
 Idaho School for the Deaf and the Blind website
 Gooding Idaho Chamber of Commerce
 North Valley Academy

Cities in Idaho
Cities in Gooding County, Idaho
County seats in Idaho
Populated places established in 1907